The Canton of Saint-Esprit is a former canton in the Arrondissement of Le Marin on Martinique. It had 9,595 inhabitants (2012). It was disbanded in 2015. The canton comprised the commune of Saint-Esprit.

References

Cantons of Martinique